Zamindaris were established in the Madras Presidency by the government of the British East India Company starting from 1799 onwards. These settlements were established in order to delineate authority to landlords and thereby relieve the ryot from the control of middlemen who often exploited them. Often, these zamindars were Indian Native princes who lost their sovereignty due to British expansion. The zamindari settlement was based on a similar settlement established in Bengal. The Zamindari settlement of Madras was largely unsuccessful and was wrapped up in 1852. However, a few Zamindaris remained till India's independence in 1947.

Land proprietorship in Madras Presidency 
In the areas administered by the British, three systems of land proprietorship existed: zamindaris, inams and ryotwaris.

In 1911, zamindari estates covered  and occupied over one-fourth of the total area of the presidency.

Zamindaris from 1799 to 1852 
The zamindari system was introduced in the Madras Presidency in 1799 in the aftermath of the defeat of the Polygars in the Polygar Wars.

Zamindaris in 1877-1920 
In 1877, C. D.Maclean made a survey of the existing zamindaris under the jurisdiction of Madras Presidency. As per this survey, a few of these zamindaris were larger than some of the smaller princely states in the Presidency. Karvatinuggur, Kalahasti, Nuzvid, Poonganur, Paralekhemidi and Podile and Darsi divisions of Venkatagiri were larger in size than the princely state of Banganapalle while Virasanapettah, Arni estate and Kanguni were larger than Sandur.

Other zamindaris 
This is a list of other zamindaris which were either not included in MaClean's list or were non-existent at the time of the enumeration.

See also

 List of Zaildars by Zail
 Indian feudalism
 Indian honorifics
 Maratha titles
 Jagirdar
 Mankari
 Lambardar
 Patwari
 Sarpanch
 Zamindar
 Princely state
 Zamindars of Bihar
 Zamindars of Bengal

References

Further reading 
 
 
 

Madras Presidency
Madras Presidency
India history-related lists